Ray "Scooter" Morrison was an American football and baseball coach. He served as the head football coach at Friends University in Wichita, Kansas from 1955 to 1956 and at Southwestern College in Winfield, Kansas from 1962 to 1963. Morrison was also head baseball coach at the Municipal University of Wichita—now known as Wichita State University—from 1957 to 1960, tallying a mark of 54–44.  He coached football at Pratt High School in Kansas before moving to Southwestern.

Head coaching record

Collège football

References

Year of birth missing
Year of death missing
American football fullbacks
American football halfbacks
Friends Falcons football coaches
Wichita State Shockers baseball coaches
Wichita State Shockers baseball players
Wichita State Shockers football coaches
Wichita State Shockers football players
Southwestern Moundbuilders football coaches
High school football coaches in Kansas